Signal timing is the technique which traffic engineers use to distribute right-of-way at a signalized intersection. The process includes selecting appropriate values for timing, which are implemented in specialized traffic signal controllers. Signal timing involves deciding how much green time the traffic signal provides an intersection by movement or approach (depending on the lane configuration), how long the pedestrian WALK signal should be, whether trains or buses should be prioritized, and numerous other factors.

Basic signal timing operation

To understand basic signal timing fundamentals, one must also understand the different modes of operation of the signal controller which controls the signal. Traffic signals may be placed into two broad groups by their method of operation. They can be either pre-timed or actuated. Pre-timed signals provide each intersection approach a fixed amount of time on a predetermined basis, serving each approach consecutively, and repeating the pattern.  In normal operation, no movements are skipped. An actuated traffic signal relies on some mechanism for detecting vehicles as they approach the intersection. Where detection has occurred, green time is provided to that approach. Approaches with no detection are skipped. These two schemes are also referred to as interval-based and phase-based signal timing.

The National Electrical Manufacturers Association (NEMA) has defined a standard scheme by which each intersection movement may be serviced without allowing conflicting movements to enter the intersection simultaneously. This scheme is commonly referred to as the NEMA Phasing Diagram.

One of the most frequently used methods of detection is induction loops. Other methods include magnetometers, video, infrared, radar and microwave detection. A typical loop detector installation could be approximately six feet square or six feet wide by thirty feet long. Other shapes may also be used including circular and hexagonal loops. These are cut into, or buried below the surface of the roadway. The preferred wire is stranded copper with an insulating cover, which is then loosely surrounded by a protection jacket. Electrically, this is a 'flat' coil in the pavement structure that detects vehicles by changes in the magnetic inductance field of the coil when ferrous metal from a vehicle passes through the field. The electronic sensor in the controller cabinet senses the change in the magnetic field. The output from the sensor electronics is a 'switch' closure. This can be an electro-mechincial relay or solid-state. The 'switch' is normally closed (NC) in the de-engerized state but held open when power is applied to the circuit. This is called 'Fail-Call' so that if there is a failure in the sensor electronics, the output will place a 'Call' to the controller as if a vehicle is present on the loop detector.  

Video (both normal and infrared) use a change in contrast of the image detection zone to detect traffic. All detection methods except inductive loop detectors and magnetometers suffer in accuracy as the result of the concept of occlusion. This limits the cameras view in certain instances.

There are different categories of actuated signals. To save money on maintenance, some agencies opt to design an intersection as semi-actuated. Semi-actuated means the intersection has detection on the minor street approaches and major street left turns only. The whole intersection is then programmed to operate a fixed time every cycle, but the controller will service the other movements only when there is a 'call' or demand. An arterial series of signals that are operating in a semi-actuated or fixed mode and importantly operating with the same cycle length can be made to function in a coordinated manner. During signal coordination, most signal systems typically are designed to operate in a semi-actuated mode.

In fixed operation, a controller has a set programmed time to service all movements every cycle. The controller will service all movements whether or not there is vehicle demand. When a detector at an actuated signal breaks, that movement will then have to operate as fixed until the detector is repaired.

There are three general ways for a signal to operate, FREE, COORD, and FLASH operation. In FREE operation, the signal is running based on its own demand and timing parameters based on the information provided by its detectors. It is not operating under any background cycle length. In COORD operation, short for coordination, the signal is running a background cycle length. Non-major street movements are usually still actuated, and the controller will rest on the major street until the background cycle length is fulfilled. The final mode is FLASH operation in which all vehicle signal heads continuously display a flashing red, or the main street shows flashing yellow while others show flashing red. Pedestrian heads are dark. 

When the volume of vehicles at an intersection no longer warrants the signal to be active, the signal can switch to FLASH mode. When volume picks up again the signal switches back into either FREE or COORD operation. For example, the daily operation of a signal may involve it being in FLASH mode early in the morning, COORD during the day, FREE in the evening, and back to FLASH late at night.

Basic timing functions

There are several basic timing functions that need to be programmed for the traffic controller to operate. 

MIN time determines the minimum duration of the green interval for each movement. Left turns, minor streets, major streets, usually have different MIN times. Left turns and minor side street intervals are often in the range from 4 to 10 seconds while major streets often go higher than 15. 

Gap, extension, or passage time determines the extendable portion of the green time for a movement. The movement remains in the extendable portion as long as an actuation is present and the passage timer has not expired. If the interval is set as three seconds and there is not vehicle present after that three seconds, the movement will terminate.

MAX time limits of a maximum time of the green interval. If there are no conflicting demands on the intersection, the controller will ignore the MAX and rest in the major street movement.

Yellow Clearance determines the yellow time for the associated movement.

Red Clearance determines the all-red time for the associated movement.

Walk time provides the length of the walk indication.

Flashing Don't Walk is the duration of the flashing pedestrian clearance. This is timed as the length of the crosswalk divided by a speed of 3.5 feet per second, minus the yellow clearance for the adjacent vehicle movement.

Cycle Length controls the time from one major street yellow to the next major street yellow for purposes of coordination. It is often set by the master controller for the particular plan used. This is also used if the signal has no detectors attached.

Offset controls the timing of the start of the major street green and/or the end of the major street green, to keep the signal in coordination with other signals in the overall timing plan. This timing can be set by the master controller for the particular plan used.

Coordination

Coordination (the more correct term is progression) refers to the timing of the signals so that a "platoon" of cars traveling on a street arrives at a succession of green lights and proceeds through multiple intersections without stopping. A well coordinated signal system can enhance traffic flow, reduce delay and minimize pollution. However, it is not always possible to retain progression throughout a network of signals. It is also difficult to maintain signal progression on a two-way street. An early traffic engineer Henry Barnes, who served as Commissioner of Traffic in many cities including Baltimore, Maryland and New York City, developed coordinated traffic signal timings, so that large amounts of traffic could be accommodated on major traffic arterials. 
 
Traffic signal timing is a very complex topic. For example timing a 'WALK' signal for a wide pedestrian crossing and slower pedestrians (for example the elderly) could result in very long waits for vehicles, and thus increases the likelihood of cars running the light, which could potentially cause accidents. Therefore, optimizing the safety of intersections involves multiple factors like street width, lane width, number of intersecting streets, availability of electricity for a signal, number of cars per unit of time and even/uneven nature of flow, number and type of pedestrians, and many other factors. 

Traffic signals can be programmed to have different signal timing plans, depending on the time of day. Some signal control systems adapt signal timings depending on measured traffic conditions.

Research
Standardizing signal timing procedures, standards, and best practices has been completed in the form of the Signal Timing Manual, sponsored by the Federal Highway Administration. The Signal Timing Manual is a tabletop resource compiled by Kittelson & Associates, Inc., the Texas Transportation Institute, the Institute of Transportation Engineers (ITE), and the University of Maryland.

In March 2020, the ITE adopted Beaverton, Oregon engineering consultant Mats Järlström's recommendations for yellow light timing. Järlström had begun investigating the matter after his wife received a ticket from a red light camera in 2013. After he published his findings, the state of Oregon fined him for practicing engineering without a license. Järlström, who has a degree in electrical engineering, filed suit in the federal District Court alleging violation of his First Amendment rights. The court agreed with him, ruling that the state could not restrict the use of the word "engineer".

References

External links
 Transport Research Laboratory
 The Signal Timing Manual site
 FHWA Arterial Management Website

Traffic signals